Gene Whisnant (born December 8, 1943) is a Republican politician from the US state of Oregon. He serves in the Oregon House of Representatives representing District 53, which encompasses most of Deschutes County, including the cities of Redmond and Sisters, and portions of the city of Bend.

Early life and military career
Whisnant was born in North Carolina, and attended West Mecklenburg High School in Charlotte, later graduating from the University of North Carolina at Chapel Hill in 1966 with a bachelor's degree in journalism. He later received a master's degree in International Affairs from the University of Arkansas in 1976.

In 1966, Whisnant was commissioned to the United States Air Force from the Air Force Reserve Officer Training Corps, attending Air Command and Staff College and National Defense University. He served in the Vietnam War, where he flew 32 missions as a combat cameraman. Whisnant also served on American bases in Germany and Yugoslavia, where he served in various command and staff positions before his retirement as a colonel in the early 1990s.

Political career
Following his retirement from the military, Whisnant moved to Oregon and became involved in politics in Deschutes County, serving as the treasurer and later chairman of the Deschutes County Republican Party. In 2003, he was appointed to fill the vacant seat in the Oregon House of Representatives created when Ben Westlund was appointed to a seat in the Oregon Senate. and has been re-elected four times, most recently in 2010. He served as the deputy Republican whip and was Republican whip in 2007.

Whisnant is a member of the American Legislative Exchange Council (ALEC), serving as Oregon state leader. In August 2011, he was given ALEC's 2011 Legislator of the Year Award. His support and advocacy in animal-related measures saw him labeled as a 2011 "Top Dog" by the Oregon Humane Society.

Personal life
Whisnant's wife is Josie Whisnant. They have one son. Whisnant and his family live in Sunriver.

References

External links
Legislative website
Project VoteSmart biography
Campaign website

1943 births
21st-century American politicians
Living people
Republican Party members of the Oregon House of Representatives
People from Caroleen, North Carolina
People from Deschutes County, Oregon
Politicians from Charlotte, North Carolina
United States Air Force officers
University of Arkansas alumni
UNC Hussman School of Journalism and Media alumni
Military personnel from Oregon